The Victorian Railways and their successors operated a number of named passenger trains, both formal and informal. This page provides details on each of the less notable services, and links to main pages for the remainder.

Some of these services were named to draw attention to their prestige level of service; others were named because they ran a specific roster or schedule, and these names were more often informal and occasionally picked up by the Railways in an official capacity later.

Melbourne suburban region
The Melbourne Suburban Region of the Victorian Railways' network was defined as all stations from the city centre to Dandenong, Gembrook (narrow gauge from Upper Ferntree Gully), Glen Waverley, Healesville, Hurstbridge, Mornington, Port Melbourne, Red Hill, Sandringham, Somerton, St Albans, St Kilda, Stony Point, Warburton, Werribee, Whittlesea and Williamstown.

Suburban Rambler

This name was allocated to tours which started in the city and ran to three or four random destinations in the suburban area.

The Boat Train

The Boat Train was a short-lived experiment that used a set of Tait trains, specially painted, on shuttle runs between Flinders Street station and Port Melbourne to meet ships arriving from overseas.

Western and South Western region
The Western and South Western Region of the Victorian Railways' network was defined as all stations on the Down (west) side of Sunshine towards Ballarat, and the Down (south-west) side of Werribee. These two mainlines ran through Ballarat to Adelaide, and through Geelong to Port Fairy respectively. The region also included the branches from these lines to Avoca via either Ararat or Maryborough, Balmoral, Bolangum, Buninyong, Carpolac, Casterton, Coleraine, Crowes via Beech Forrest (narrow gauge), Daylesford via Newlyn, Forrest, Fyansford, Grampians, Inglewood via Llanelly, Maroona via Gheringhap, Millewa South, Morkalla, Mortlake, Mount Gambier via Rennick, Panitya, Patchewollock, Portland, Queenscliff, Redan, Skipton, Timboon, Waubra, Wensleydale, Yaapeet, Yanac and Yelta.

Fruit Flyer

The Fruit Flyer was a fast overnight freight train operated by the Victorian Railways to bring fruit produce from the Mildura district to the Melbourne Markets. It first ran on 13 October 1958.

It departed  Mildura at 17:00, loading at Irymple, Red Cliffs, Carwarp and Hattah before running express to Dynon Freight Terminal arriving at 03:00. To allow it to operate at the line speed of 110 km/h, the wagons were fitted with bogies similar to those fitted on passenger carriages.

It initially operated three times weekly on Monday, Wednesday and Friday nights, but within a few weeks this had increased to four times. By 1961 it was running six times a week, Sunday to Friday.

Geelong Flier

The Geelong Flier was an Australian named passenger train operated by the Victorian Railways and successors, running from Melbourne to Geelong from 1926. As the first officially-named flagship service of the Victorian Railways, the train took pride of place on the timetable, and operated with some of the best available locomotives and rolling stock. In 1927 the outbound journey was extended to Port Fairy and renamed The Flier.

School Train

This name was given to various trains around the state at different times, all on rosters explicitly designed to take children in the regional areas to and from schools. Some operated with railmotors, others with older passenger carriages such as the PL series.

The Overland

The Overland, is an Australian passenger train service between Melbourne and Adelaide. It first ran in 1887 as the Adelaide Express, and has been called the Melbourne Express by South Australians. It was given its current name in 1926. Now operated by private company Journey Beyond Rail Expeditions, the train completes two return trips a week covering 828 kilometres between the state capitals. Originally an overnight train, it now operates during the day.

The Vinelander

The Vinelander was operated by the Victorian Railways and later V/Line between Melbourne and Mildura from 1972 to 1993. Operating overnight along the Mildura line, it included motorail and sleeping car facilities.

The Westcoaster

The Westcoaster was a passenger train named by the Victorian Railways. It ran from the state capital Melbourne, Australia to the regional city of Warrnambool. On the Warrnambool line it had buffet facilities on board. Between 1993 and 2004 the private company West Coast Railway used the name on its services to and from Warrnambool. After the decline of WCR the name generally fell out of use.

The Ghan

In November 1998, one of the Ghan services from Darwin to Adelaide was extended to Melbourne.<ref>GSR's Ghan Commences Melbourne Runs Catch Point issue 129 January 1999 page 5</ref> The extension was withdrawn in November 2002.

North-Eastern region
The North-Eastern Region of the Victorian Railways' network was defined as all stations on the Down (north) side of Somerton. This was primarily the mainline to Albury and Sydney and the secondary route via Shepparton to Tocumwal, and their branches to Alexandra, Bendigo via Heathcote, Bright, Cobram, Colbinabbin, Cudgewa, Echuca via Kyabram, Girgarre, Katamatite, Mansfield, Oaklands, Peechelba East, Picola, Tatong, Wahgunyah, Whitfield (narrow gauge) and Yackandandah.

Intercapital Daylight

The Intercapital Daylight ran between Melbourne and Albury from 1955 to 1962, connecting with a standard gauge service of the same name and operated by the New South Wales Government Railways to Sydney. After the standard gauge line was extended to Melbourne the train ran the whole length from Melbourne to Sydney.

School Train

This name was given to various trains around the state at different times, all on rosters explicitly designed to take children in the regional areas to and from schools. Some operated with railmotors, others with older passenger carriages such as the PL series.

Between Kyabram and Echuca, the run was operated by a 153 hp Walker railmotor hauling three trailer cars, only possible because the line was practically flat. It left Kyabram at 7:37am each school day and made about 30 stops at both stations and level crossings enroute to pick up around 200 students, many of whom left their bicycles unguarded at the pickup point for the day. Students were segregated by gender, and second preference was given to allocating separate carriages for each school. The complete consist had to be sent to Bendigo Workshops for repairs every school holiday period.

Southern Aurora

The Southern Aurora ran overnight between Melbourne and Sydney between 1962 and 1986. It was jointly operated by the Victorian Railways and the New South Wales Government Railways.

Spirit of Progress

The Spirit of Progress ran between Melbourne and Albury from 1937 to 1962, connecting with a standard gauge service to Sydney. After the standard gauge line was extended to Melbourne the train ran the whole length from Melbourne to Sydney, acting as a sweeper service to the new premier Southern Aurora service.

Sydney/Melbourne Express

The Sydney and Melbourne Express trains ran from 1986 to 1993, replacing the Spirit of Progress and the Southern Aurora.

Eastern region
The Eastern Region of the Victorian Railways' network was defined as all stations on the Down (east) side of Dandenong. This included the lines to Gippsland to Orbost and the South Gippsland to Port Albert, and their branches to Briagolong, Coal Creek, Maffra, Mirboo North, Noojee, Outtrim, Strzelecki, Thorpdale, Walhalla (narrow gauge), Wonthaggi, Woodside and Yallourn.

Maryvale Paper Train

After several years of negotiations, V/Line Freight won the contract for transport of large quantities of containerised paper products from Maryvale, in the Gippsland region, for both Victorian and interstate customers. Trains would be split in the city with one portion unloaded at Footscray Road and the other at the Dynon terminal respectively; the latter loading was then transferred to National Rail freight trains running towards Sydney or Adelaide as required. The first service ran on 12 March 1996, using VQDW "Jumbo" container flat wagons which could each be loaded with two 40 ft containers. The initial contract was worth about $1.6 million per year for five years, with 160,000 tonnes of goods expected to run in the first year (about 800 tonnes per train) of which about two-thirds was domestic and the balance interstate.

In 1999 the contract transferred to Freight Victoria (later Freight Australia), who were purchased by Pacific National in 2004. In 2013 the contract was handed over to QUBE Logistics, partially because Pacific National was withdrawing most of its Victorian operations. At the time, Australian Paper was transporting less than 300,000 tonnes of freight yearly by rail, with the balance by road. To cater for an additional proposed 100,000 tonnes per year of loading, QUBE invested in a fleet of 80 ft skeletal flat wagons, some of which were deployed on the Maryvale run.

As of 2019, the most common operation uses two of the four locomotives VL353, VL356 & VL360, G512 and G515, hauling the equivalent of around 30 40 ft containers on about twenty Jumbo-length wagons.

School Train

This name was given to various trains around the state at different times, all on rosters explicitly designed to take children in the regional areas to and from schools. Some operated with railmotors, others with older passenger carriages such as the PL series.

The GippslanderThe Gippslander was a named passenger train operated by the Victorian Railways from Melbourne through the Gippsland region to Bairnsdale. Operating along the Gippsland line daily except Sundays it had buffet car facilities provided.

The train was named in 1954 to celebrate the electrification of the main line as far Traralgon, but 66 years after the passenger service had commenced along the line. The train was originally hauled by an L class electric locomotive from Melbourne to Traralgon, where an R class steam locomotive took over for the journey to Sale, with the final leg to Bairnsdale hauled by a J class steam locomotive. Steam traction on the service was later replaced by T class diesel locomotives.

After the decommissioning of the overhead system in the 1980s a variety of diesel locomotives could be seen hauling the train. The Gippslander name continues in use today for V/Line intercity services along the line but no special facilities are provided.

The Snow Train

This train runs yearly from Melbourne to Traralgon, generally using double R Class locomotives and hauling 10-14 carriages.

Excursion trains
This section covers a handful of VicRail-era services and the majority of modern-era excursion and themed trips which operate to various destinations without a set route or schedule, and which are not restricted to one of the above regions.

Explorer trains

The Explorer trains are a range of heritage tours operating from Melbourne along the remaining broad gauge regional mainlines, providing day or overnight trips using heritage vehicles. Typical examples are the Goulburn Valley Explorer, Northern Explorer, Otway Explorer and others, generally using similar consists and operating once or twice per year.

Food-and-drink experience trains

Many of Victoria's preserved railway groups operate dining trains on a regular basis, ranging from annually to daily. Examples include the Ale trains on the Mornington and Victorian Goldfields lines, the Luncheon and Night Train specials on Puffing Billy and the Q Train and Blues Train on the Queenscliff line.

Silver Streak
The Silver Streak operates from Daylesford station on the first Saturday of each month, using preserved railmotor 40DRC. It offers finger foods, drinks and live music.

Melbourne Limited

The Melbourne Limited was a steam-hauled luxury train that operated between 1985 and 1987. It used steam locomotive R766 and carriages from the South Australian Railways' steel fleet, refurbished, repainted and named after Victorian lakes.

Murder/Mystery-themed trains

Many of Victoria's preserved railway groups operate themed murder/mystery specials around late October each year.

Southern Cross Express

The Southern Cross Express was the successor to the above-mentioned Melbourne Limited, which had previously been operated by Steam Age.

The Vintage Train

Train of Knowledge

Veteran Train

Weekender trains

The Weekender trains are a range of heritage tours operating from Melbourne along the remaining broad gauge regional mainlines, providing full weekend tours departing on Friday nights and returning late Sunday night or occasionally on Monday. One such example is the Maldon Weekender, which operates in conjunction with the Victorian Goldfields Railway and is often used to swap rolling stock between that group and Steamrail Victoria. The consists use sleeping and dining carriages drawn from the pools of various heritage operators. On the weekends between the outbound and return trips the carriages are sometimes used to provide local shuttles, such as between Bendigo and Castlemaine. These trips tend to run once or twice per year.

Other trains
Better Farming Train

The Better Farming Train was an agricultural demonstration train which toured Victoria, Australia in the 1920s and 1930s to promote better farming practices. It was the first of two agricultural demonstration trains to run in Australia.

Commissioner's Train

Hospital Train

Jubilee Train

News Train

These trains departed Flinders Street around midnight each weekday for the regional areas, dropping off freshly-printed newspapers for distribution.

Puffing Billy

The name Puffing Billy, while now used primarily to refer to the Belgrave to Gembrook tourist line, was originally used to describe the narrow gauge NA class locomotives running on all four of Victoria's narrow gauge railways.

RESO Train

The Reso Train, officially the State Resources Train, was a train operated by the Victorian Railways to bring business leaders from Melbourne and regional Victoria together. The concept was promoted by Harold Clapp, Chairman of Commissioners of the Victorian Railways with the city leaders travelling on the train to various parts of the state. It was complemented by the Better Farming Train'' from 1924. The first train ran to Swan Hill and Mildura in August 1922.

A typical consist in 1934 when the train was making its 22nd journey, accommodated 60 passengers with the train made up of a parlor car, three sleeping carriages, a dining car, an office car, a staff car and a van. It ceased with the outbreak of World War II, before resuming in May 1947.

The train was described in the August 1954 Victorian Railways News Letter as having four or five sleeping cars, plus an unidentified 42-seater dining car, the original Norman, the first Carey, Goulburn and possibly a brake van.

A typical itinerary is demonstrated by the trains 53rd journey in March 1959 where it left Melbourne on a five-day journey with the passengers visiting the Hume Weir, Rutherglen Research Station, Mount Buffalo National Park, Kiewa Hydroelectric Scheme and the rayon and wool industries of Wangaratta.

Royal Train

The Display Train

The Medical Train

This train ran around the state on a semi-regular schedule, with a travelling doctor who provided checkups for railway employees at isolated locations. In addition to living quarters and normal doctor facilities the carriage included a black, 26 ft long corridor with red, yellow and green lights at the far end which was used to test for colour and distance sighting.

The Weedex and Fire Attack trains

This train ran around the state each year spraying weed-killer along the trackside. This was done to prevent growth of weeds which could later dry out and become a fire hazard.

During the fire season some of the train vehicles could be mobilised to form a consist that could spray water lineside, although this was rarely used.

References

External links
Geelong Flyer at Rail Geelong website

Photos
'Classic' Gippslander:
The Gippslander, electric hauled in 1981
The Gippslander, loco changeover in 1986
The Gippslander, diesel hauled in 1988

Named passenger trains of Victoria (Australia)
Victoria
Victoria (Australia)-related lists